Malcolm Read (born 8 January 1941) is a British field hockey player. He competed in the men's tournament at the 1968 Summer Olympics.

References

External links
 

1941 births
Living people
British male field hockey players
Olympic field hockey players of Great Britain
Field hockey players at the 1968 Summer Olympics
Place of birth missing (living people)